Nogometni klub Mura, commonly referred to as NK Mura or simply Mura, was a Slovenian association football club based in Murska Sobota. The club was founded on 16 August 1924 as one of the first clubs in the Prekmurje region. The club had its golden years in the 1990s when they won the Slovenian Football Cup. During this period they were also the runners-up of the Slovenian PrvaLiga on two occasions. They played their home matches at Fazanerija City Stadium.

NK Mura was dissolved during the 2004–05 season after the club failed to obtain competition licences issued by the Football Association of Slovenia. The football association had allowed the club to finish the 2004–05 season, which was already in progress, and after finishing eighth in the national championship NK Mura effectively ceased all operations.

History
NK Mura was founded in Murska Sobota on 16 August 1924 in the congress hall of Hotel Dobraj. Their first match came on 31 August 1924 at home against SK Maribor, which was won by the visiting team 6–0. In the first year of the club the team played one more match. This was against SK Merkur from Maribor, which ended with another loss for Mura (3–1).

The best period in the history of the club was after 1991 when Slovenia gained independence. Their best result in the Slovenian PrvaLiga was finishing as the runners-up in the 1993–94 and 1997–98 seasons. In the 1993–94 season the club also finished as the runners-up in the Slovenian Cup. In May 1995, Mura won the 1994–95 Slovenian Football Cup with a 2–1 aggregate victory over Celje. With this title the club secured an invitation to play in the newly established Slovenian Supercup at the start of the next season. The match was played in Ljubljana and was won by Olimpija 2–1.

Mura had a string of mixed results for the remainder of their final seasons, despite acquiring highly regarded coaches such as Miroslav Blažević. The club became financially unstable; in their last season, the club had struggled on the pitch and failed to obtain competition licences issued by the Football Association of Slovenia, which led to its dissolution in 2005. The club finished the last competitive season (2004–05) in eight place in a league with twelve teams. A successor club was established in 2005 under the name ND Mura 05; however, they are legally not considered to be the same club and their records and honours are kept separate by the Football Association of Slovenia. Mura 05 was later disbanded in 2013.

Honours
League
Slovenian Republic League
 Winners: 1969–70

Slovenian PrvaLiga
 Runners-up: 1993–94, 1997–98

Cup
Slovenian Republic Cup
 Winners: 1974–75
 Runners-up: 1972–73

Slovenian Cup
 Winners: 1994–95
 Runners-up: 1993–94

Slovenian Supercup
 Runners-up: 1995

League history since 1991

European record
All results (home and away) list Mura's goal tally first.

Notes
 PR: Preliminary round
 QR: Qualifying round
 1Q: First qualifying round
 2Q: Second qualifying round

References

 
Football clubs in Yugoslavia
Defunct football clubs in Slovenia
Association football clubs established in 1924
Association football clubs disestablished in 2005
1924 establishments in Slovenia